The Tennessee Railroad  was a short line standard gauge (4 ft 8in) common carrier railroad running from Oneida, Tennessee to Fork Mountain, Tennessee. Reorganized in 1973 by the Southern Railway as the Tennessee Railway, it remains a subsidiary of Norfolk Southern.

Sold at foreclosure on Valentine’s Day in 1918, the Tennessee Railway never was a financial powerhouse. In 1957, the railroad retired its last steam locomotive. In 1959, the first petition for abandonment was filed, but the coal business picked up and it was withdrawn. In 1973, with the railroad in receivership, the line became part of the Southern Railway. In the years following, Southern upgraded the line with new ties and rail, daylighted the tunnel near Oneida, and streamlined operations to make the line an important feeder for coal traffic.  

As environmental regulations became stricter, and large low-sulfur coal reserves were discovered in Wyoming’s Powder River Basin, coal mining operations in the area began to play out. By 2005, it appeared the Tennessee was again doomed when Southern Railway successor Norfolk Southern filed to abandon the line, but thanks to National Coal Corporation, the line was purchased with hopes that the coal mining industry would once again use this route. National Coal originally selected Watco to manage and operate the line, but only one train ran in 2006. Since then the line has been inactive. In 2008, a company known as the New River Railway began operating passenger excursion trains over various parts of the line.

In 1991, American country music band The Desert Rose Band filmed part of their music video for the single "You Can Go Home" at the Tennessee Railroad Museum.

References

Defunct Tennessee railroads
Predecessors of the Southern Railway (U.S.)
Railway companies established in 1918
Railway companies disestablished in 1973
1918 establishments in Tennessee
1973 disestablishments in Tennessee